The Accreditation Association for Ambulatory Health Care (AAAHC), founded in 1979, is an American organization which accredits ambulatory health care organizations, including ambulatory surgery centers, office-based surgery centers, endoscopy centers, and college student health centers, as well as health plans, such as health maintenance organizations and preferred provider organizations. AAAHC has been granted "deemed status" to certify ambulatory surgery centers for Medicare by the Centers for Medicare and Medicaid Services.  In 2009, the AAAHC added the Medical home to the types of organizations that it accredits.  It offers on-site surveys for organizations seeking Medical Home accreditation or certification.

The AAAHC survey model is one of cooperation and education.  It is unique in offering accreditation surveys that are conducted by professionals who are actively involved in ambulatory care and have first-hand understanding of the specific issues facing the facilities they survey.  Surveyors assess how an organization meets prevailing Standards and share their knowledge and experience with others to help ambulatory service providers maintain high standards.  AAAHC is one of three organizations that accredits office-based surgery practices, the others being the Joint Commission on Accreditation of Healthcare Organizations and the American Association for Accreditation of Ambulatory Surgery Facilities.

In 2010, the organization extended its accreditation services internationally, beginning with Costa Rica.  The program has since expanded to Peru and further expansion is planned.  AAAHC announced the launch of a new accreditation program for hospitals in 2012, which will focus on small hospitals and will be offered through a new entity established by AAAHC, the Accreditation Association for Hospitals/Health Systems Inc. (AAHHS).

AAAHC continuously reviews its standards and revises current standards and adds new standards as required by the constantly changing health care arena.  Each year in August there is a public comment period where these revisions and additions are presented for review and comment by interested parties.

History
The Accreditation Association was formed in 1979 by six member organizations including the American College Health Association, the ASC Association, and the Medical Group Management Association.

The Accreditation Association has 18 Association Members:
Ambulatory Surgery Foundation
American Academy of Cosmetic Surgery
American Academy of Dental Group Practice
American Academy of Dermatology
American Academy of Facial Plastic and Reconstructive Surgery
American Association of Oral and Maxillofacial Surgeons
American College of Gastroenterology
American College Health Association
American College of Mohs Surgery 
American College of Obstetricians and Gynecologists
American Dental Association
American Gastroenterological Association
American Society of Anesthesiologists
American Society for Dermatologic Surgery
American Society for Gastrointestinal Endoscopy
Association of periOperative Registered Nurses
Medical Group Management Association
Society of Ambulatory Anesthesia

Accreditation process
Standards are reviewed and updated annually to keep up with current trends and technologies in the health care arena. AAAHC surveyors are volunteers: physicians, dentists, podiatrists, pharmacists, nurses and administrators who are actively involved with ambulatory health care.

AAAHC offers a three-year term of accreditation.  An organization may also receive a deferral or denial of accreditation if compliance is not met.

Institute for Quality Improvement
In 1999, the AAAHC founded its non-profit subsidiary, the AAAHC Institute for Quality Improvement (AAAHC Institute) to offer performance measurement opportunities and related quality improvement/educational programs to ambulatory health care organizations. The AAAHC Institute has conducted and published more than 70 studies.

See also
List of healthcare accreditation organizations in the USA

References

External links
 Accreditation Association for Ambulatory Health Care

Medical and health organizations based in Illinois
Healthcare accreditation organizations in the United States